This is a list of the 174 municipalities in the province of Granada, Spain.

+ a new municipality of Játar was created in 2015 from part of Arenas del Rey municipality.
++ two new municipalities have been created out of parts of Iznalloz municipality - Dehesas Viejas in 2014 and Domingo Pérez in 2015; the 2018 figure for Iznalloz reflects these changes.+++ a new municipality of Torrenueva Costa was created on 2 October 2018 from part of Motril municipality; the populations at both 2010 and 2018 are included in those of Motril.

See also

Geography of Spain
List of cities in Spain

References

 
Granada